Magnetovision is the measuring technique enabling the visualization of magnetic field distribution in a given space.

Measuring setup 

Magnetovision measuring stand consists of a magnetometer, X-Y or X-Y-Z movement mechanism and data processing and visualization system.
Following modes of magnetovision signal acquisition are possible:

 magnetometer moves in the measurement area (e.g. over tested object)
 tested object moves against the magnetometer
 array of magnetic field sensors is used

Magnetometers 

Typically, following types of sensors may be used:

 magnetoresistance effect based sensors
 fluxgate magnetometers
 Hall effect sensors
 SQUIDs

Types 

There are different modes of magnetovision measurements. Measurements may be performed in 2D (X-Y) or 3D (X-Y-Z). Moreover, measurements of magnetic field may be absolute, differential or gradiometric.

Applications 

Magnetovision may be used for:

 nondestructive testing in civil engineering
 detection of dangerous metallic objects
 archeology

Data fusion 

Magnetovision images may be used for data fusion with visual signal. This creates new possibility of presentation of magnetic field distribution for further analyses.

References 

Magnetism